Mario M. Giannelli (December 24, 1920 – July 2, 2003), nicknamed "Yo-Yo", was an American football guard in the National Football League. He played for the Philadelphia Eagles for four seasons from 1948–1951. He was drafted by the Boston Yanks in the twentieth round of the 1945 NFL Draft, but did not play for them. He played college football at Boston College.

College career
Giannelli played college football at Boston College in 1942, 1946 and 1947. In 1942, he played on the team that made it to the 1943 Orange Bowl. Giannelli's college career was broken up by World War II, and he fought in the Battle of Okinawa in 1945. While in the Army, he was a champion boxer. He returned to football in 1946, and in 1948 he was selected to the College All-Star Game.

Gianelli was inducted into the Boston College Varsity Club Athletic Hall of Fame in 1991.

Professional career
Giannelli was drafted by the Boston Yanks in the twentieth round (201st overall) of the 1945 NFL Draft, but did not play for them. He signed with the Philadelphia Eagles in 1948, and played in the 1948 and 1949 NFL Championship Games. He was re-signed on June 30, 1951, but was traded to the Green Bay Packers on April 25, 1952 in exchange for guard Buddy Burris. He retired from football on July 29, 1952 and returned to his hometown of Everett, Massachusetts.

Death
Giannelli died on July 2, 2003 in Chelsea, Massachusetts at the age of 82.

References

External links

Boston College Eagles football bio

1920 births
2003 deaths
Sportspeople from Everett, Massachusetts
Players of American football from Massachusetts
American football offensive guards
Boston College Eagles football players
Philadelphia Eagles players
United States Army personnel of World War II